Tours VB is a professional men's volleyball club which is playing their home matches at the Salle Robert Grenon in Tours, France.

Tours VB plays in LNV Ligue A, top volleyball league in France. According to Media Guide book, the annual budget of Tours is € 2,500,000 for Season 2021/2022 which is the highest budget of all teams.

Honours

Domestic
 French Championship
Winners (8): 2003–04, 2009–10, 2011–12, 2012–13, 2013–14, 2014–15, 2017–18, 2018–19

 French Cup
Winners (10): 2002–03, 2004–05, 2005–06, 2008–09, 2009–10, 2010–11, 2012–13, 2013–14, 2014–15, 2018–19

 French SuperCup
Winners (4): 2005–06, 2012–13, 2014–15, 2015–16

International
 CEV Champions League
Winners (1): 2004–05
Silver (1): 2006–07
Final Four (1): 2003–04

 CEV Cup
Winners (1): 2016–17
Silver (1): 2021–22

Team
As of 2022–23 season

References

External links
 Official website 
 Team profile at Volleybox.net

French volleyball clubs
Volleyball clubs established in 1966
1966 establishments in France